Engelberto "Biboy" Rivera (born March 25, 1974) is a world-champion Ten-pin bowler from the Philippines. He has won the WTBA World Tenpin Bowling Championships in 2006 and the Asian Games gold medal for men's singles bowling in 2010. Rivera is also the recipient of the Philippine Sportswriters' Association (PSA) Athlete of the Year Award twice (in 2006 and 2011).

Career and Honors
Rivera won 10 championships from the Southeast Asian level up to the world stage culminating in his 2006 World Championships win. He has won a gold medal in the 2001 Southeast Asian Games in Kuala Lumpur and in the 2002 Asian Championships in Hong Kong, he teamed up with fellow Filipino Chester King to win the men's doubles gold. He is also a regular fixture at the Asian Bowling circuit culminating in a runner-up finish in the Grand Slam finals in 2009. Aside from his 2006 World Championship win, he has won runners-up finishes from the World Cup back in 2010 and 2011.

References

Rivera, Biboyl
Sportspeople from Quezon City
Living people
1974 births
Asian Games medalists in bowling
Bowlers at the 2002 Asian Games
Bowlers at the 2006 Asian Games
Bowlers at the 2010 Asian Games
Bowlers at the 2014 Asian Games
Asian Games gold medalists for the Philippines
Medalists at the 2010 Asian Games
Southeast Asian Games silver medalists for the Philippines
Southeast Asian Games bronze medalists for the Philippines
Southeast Asian Games medalists in bowling
Competitors at the 2001 Southeast Asian Games